The 2002 Hopman Cup (also known as the Hyundai Hopman Cup for sponsorship reasons) was a tennis championship won by Spain's Arantxa Sánchez Vicario and Tommy Robredo. Sánchez Vicario and Robredo defeated the United States (Monica Seles and Jan-Michael Gambill) in the final at the Burswood Entertainment Complex in Perth, Western Australia.

Seeds

Play-off

Italy vs. Greece

Group A

Teams and standings

Australia vs. Argentina

Australia vs. Switzerland

Spain vs. Argentina

Spain vs. Australia

Spain vs. Switzerland

Switzerland vs. Argentina

Group B

Teams and standings

 did not qualify. The matches where Italy beat them in the qualifying round do not count in these standings.

Belgium vs. France

Belgium vs. Italy

Italy vs. France

Italy vs. United States

United States vs. Belgium

United States vs. France

Final

External links

Hopman Cups by year
Hopman Cup
Hopman Cup